The Racing Strain is a 1932 American film directed by Jerome Storm.

Plot summary 
A race-car driver whose career is on the skids because of his drinking falls for a rich society girl. That motivates him to clean up his act and resume his career, but it may be too late for that.

Cast 
Wallace Reid Jr. as Bill Westcott aka The Big Shot
Dickie Moore as Bill Westcott as a Little Boy
Phyllis Barrington as Marian Martin
Paul Fix as King Kelly
J. Farrell MacDonald as Mr. Martin
Eddie Phillips as "Speed" Hall
Ethel Wales as Aunt Judy
Otto Yamaoka as Togo
Mae Busch as Tia Juana Lil
J. Frank Glendon
Lorin Raker as Jack Westcott
Donald Reed
James P. Burtis
Kit Guard as King's Mechanic

Preservation status 
This film is in the public domain, and is available for free download at the Internet Archive.

See also
List of films in the public domain in the United States

External links 

1932 films
1932 drama films
American auto racing films
American black-and-white films
American drama films
Films directed by Jerome Storm
1930s English-language films
1930s American films